Christopher Sheridan (born September 19, 1967) is an American television writer, producer, and occasional voice actor. Born in the Philippines, Sheridan grew up in New Hampshire. He attended Gilford High School, where he decided that he wanted to become a writer. After graduating from Union College, he moved back to his home, where he worked at several short-term jobs before relocating to California to start his career. His first job came in 1992 when he was hired as a writers' assistant for the Fox sitcom Shaky Ground. Following that, he was hired as an assistant on Living Single, a Fox sitcom, where he was eventually promoted to writer. He stayed with the show until its cancellation in 1998.

After the show was cancelled and Sheridan became unemployed, he began writing for the animated television series Family Guy. Although initially skeptical, he accepted the job as he did not have other options. Sheridan was one of the first writers hired, and has continued to write for the show through its eleventh season. For his work on Family Guy, he has been nominated for five Primetime Emmy Awards, a British Academy Television Award, and has won a DVD Exclusive Award. Sheridan has also written episodes of Titus and Yes, Dear. He has one daughter.

Early life
Christopher Sheridan was born on September 19, 1967, in the Philippines. He grew up in New Hampshire and attended Gilford High School. While there, Sheridan discovered he enjoyed writing, but had not considered a career in it. After graduating from the school in 1985, Sheridan went to Union College, where he majored in English and took every creative writing class available. After he met a person who had written a screenplay, Sheridan decided that he wanted to have a career in screenwriting.

After receiving his college degree in 1989, Sheridan returned to his home. He held various jobs, including substitute teaching, bartending, and working in his father's variety store. Sheridan eventually decided that if he wanted to establish a career, he had to relocate, so he moved to California in 1992. Sheridan stayed at a friend's house, and as he did not own a cell phone, he used a payphone located on Sunset Boulevard to call interested employers.

Career and later life
In 1992, Sheridan was hired as an assistant writer for the sitcom Shaky Ground. During his time on the show, he also worked elsewhere as a freelance writer. Following that show's cancellation in 1993, Sheridan was hired as an assistant on the show Living Single, where he wrote four episodes. Sheridan was promoted to writer, and worked on the show until it was cancelled in 1998. Shortly after, Sheridan received a call from his agent, where he was told that the only show with an open spot was Family Guy, which Sheridan did not want to do, thinking that writing for an animated show would end his career.

After meeting series creator Seth MacFarlane, Sheridan was hired as one of the series' first writers. The first episode he wrote was "I Never Met the Dead Man", the second episode of the first season, which premiered on April 11, 1999. Sheridan also wrote the second season premiere "Peter, Peter, Caviar Eater." He later went on to write the episodes "I Am Peter, Hear Me Roar", "If I'm Dyin', I'm Lyin'", "He's Too Sexy for His Fat",  and "Lethal Weapons".

Due to low ratings, Family Guy was cancelled at the end of its second season. While the show was on hiatus, Sheridan became a writer for the sitcom Titus and also wrote several episodes for the sitcom Yes, Dear. He returned to the show after it was revived for a fourth season, writing "The Fat Guy Strangler". Sheridan would later write the episodes "Peter's Daughter", "Peter-assment" and "Burning Down the Bayit". He penned the Road to... episode "Road to the North Pole" along with Danny Smith, and wrote the episode "Save the Clam". Sheridan continues to write for the show,  being the seventeenth season episode "Dead Dog Walking". Sheridan also infrequently provides voices for several small characters on the show, such as recurring character James William Bottomtooth III. In 2011, Sheridan wrote a television pilot entitled Lovelives for NBC. It was to star Ryan Hansen. Although a pilot was ordered and filmed, it did not continue.

Sheridan has received several nominations for awards for his work on Family Guy. At the 52nd Primetime Emmy Awards, Sheridan was nominated for a Primetime Emmy Award for Outstanding Original Music and Lyrics for writing the song "We Only Live to Kiss Your Ass." He wrote that "It was a strange experience at the Emmys ... my song was called, 'We Only Live to Kiss Your Ass.' I laughed out loud when the presenter had to list that song as one of the nominations alongside normal songs written by people like Marvin Hamlisch." Along with the other producers of the series, he was nominated for a Primetime Emmy Award for Outstanding Animated Program in 2005 for "North by North Quahog" at the 57th Primetime Emmy Awards, and again in 2006 for "PTV" at the 58th. Also in 2006, Sheridan won a DVD Exclusive Award for writing the "Stewie B. Goode" segment of the Family Guy direct to video film Stewie Griffin: The Untold Story. He shared the award with writer Gary Janetti. 2008 saw Sheridan receive another Outstanding Animated Program nomination, for "Blue Harvest", at the 60th Primetime Emmy Awards. 2008 also saw him receive a nomination for a British Academy Television Award for Best International and in 2009 he was nominated for a Primetime Emmy Award for Outstanding Comedy Series at the 61st Primetime Emmy Awards; both awards were for Family Guy in general.

Sheridan splits his time between Los Angeles and Connecticut, and has a daughter. When asked if being a parent affected his style of humor, Sheridan responded that he found himself "a little less forgiving of pedophile jokes."

He created the show Resident Alien - Duguay, Rob (March 11, 2021). "Brown Bird's music lives on in Syfy series 'Resident Alien'". The Providence Journal. Retrieved March 15, 2021.

Filmography

Awards and nominations

References

External links

1967 births
Living people
American male screenwriters
American male voice actors
Union College (New York) alumni
Filipino emigrants to the United States
People from Gilford, New Hampshire
Screenwriters from New York (state)
Screenwriters from Connecticut
Screenwriters from New Hampshire